Yaudel Lahera García (born 9 February 1992) is a Cuban football striker, who currently plays for the Honduran side Marathón.

Club career
Lahera played for his hometown team La Habana, before fleeing his country during the Central American Games in Veracruz in 2014. He had spells in Mexico before signing a one-year contract with Marathón in July 2017.

International career
He made his international debut for Cuba in a May 2011 friendly match against Nicaragua and has earned a total of 16 caps, scoring 1 goal. He represented his country in 4 FIFA World Cup qualification matches and was part of the squad for the 2011 CONCACAF Gold Cup. He played in three matches.

International goals

Honours and awards

Club
C.D. Marathón
Liga Profesional de Honduras: 2017–18 C
Honduran Supercup: 2019

References

External links
 
 

1992 births
Living people
Defecting Cuban footballers
Cuban footballers
Cuba international footballers
Cuba youth international footballers
Association football forwards
FC Ciudad de La Habana players
C.D. Tepatitlán de Morelos players
C.D. Marathón players
C.D. Honduras Progreso players
Liga Premier de México players
Liga Nacional de Fútbol Profesional de Honduras players
Cuban expatriate footballers
Expatriate footballers in Mexico
Expatriate footballers in Honduras
Cuban expatriate sportspeople in Mexico
Cuban expatriate sportspeople in Honduras
2011 CONCACAF Gold Cup players
Sportspeople from Havana